This is a list of Australian people who have been convicted of serious crimes. See demography of Australia.

Bank robbers
Australians convicted of bank robbery:
 Brenden Abbott (born 1962), known as the Postcard Bandit
 Darcy Dugan (1920–1991), bank robber and New South Wales' most notorious prison escape artist
 Keith Faure (born 1951), from Victoria, career criminal
 Victor Peirce (1958–2002), from Melbourne, member of the Pettingill family
 Gregory Roberts (born 1952), former heroin addict and convicted bank robber who escaped and fled to India; author of Shantaram

Child sex offenders
Australians convicted of child sex offences:
 Brett Peter Cowan, Australian murderer and child rapist who was convicted of the murder of Daniel Morcombe
 Mr Cruel,  an unidentified Australian serial child rapist who attacked three girls and is suspected of murdering Karmein Chan in the northern and eastern suburbs of Melbourne, Victoria. In 2016, the reward for his arrest increased from $100,000 to $1,000,000.
 Robert 'Dolly' Dunn, paedophile, died in 2009 while serving a 20-year sentence
 Dennis Ferguson, paedophile who has caused controversy in NSW and Queensland found dead in December 2012
 Rolf Harris, Australian entertainer convicted of 12 counts of indecent assault while living in the UK involving underage girls 
 Robert Hughes, actor convicted of ten child sex offences committed against five young girls, including Hey Dad! co-star Sarah Monahan between 1985 and 1990, sentenced to 10 years and 9 months with a non-parole period of six years Hughes was released from Long Bay Correctional Centre on 15 June 2022, denouncing his Australian citizenship and deported to the United Kingdom
 Brian Keith Jones, aka "Mr Baldy", serial paedophile, jailed indefinitely in 2006 for breaches of parole
 Brother Bernard McGrath, paedophile, a member of the Hospitaller Order of St John of God, McGrath has had five separate criminal trials for his crimes against vulnerable children with mental and physical disabilities in New Zealand and Australia. McGrath's offending was so prolific, the true number of his victims will never be known.
 Milton Orkopoulos, NSW state MP and child sex offender
 Patrick Power, Crown Prosecutor convicted of possessing child pornography
 Father Gerald Francis Ridsdale, paedophile, Australian Catholic priest convicted of sexual abuse against scores of children. The true number of Ridsdale's victims will never be known but by his own admission, is believed to be in the hundreds.
 Father Vincent Gerard Ryan, paedophile, Australian Catholic priest convicted of sexual abuse against 37 children.
 Peter Scully, paedophile charged with abduction, human trafficking, rape, torture and murder. Known for creating and selling the dark web video Daisy's Destruction, which features the torture and rape of three girls including 18-month-old Daisy. Scully and his girlfriend Carme Ann Alvarez, who also abused children in Scully's videos, were sentenced to life imprisonment.
 Robert Kingsley Whitehead was convicted of 24 counts of child sexual offences in 2015, dying in prison later that year. Whitehead, who had been convicted of offences against children in 1959, was involved for decades with the railways and railway enthusiast groups, including the Puffing Billy Railway, through which he gained access to many young volunteers.

Drug traffickers

Australians convicted of drug-related crimes both in Australia and overseas:
 Dennis Allen (1951–1987) nicknamed "Mr. Death," member of the Pettingill family
 Bali Nine:
 Andrew Chan, sentenced to death in Indonesia on 14 February 2006 and executed by firing squad on 29 April 2015
 Si Yi Chen, sentenced to life imprisonment in Indonesia on 16 February 2006
 Michael Czugaj, sentenced to life imprisonment in Indonesia on 14 February 2006
 Renae Lawrence, sentenced to 20 years' imprisonment in Indonesia
 Tan Duc Thanh Nguyen, sentenced to life imprisonment in Indonesia on 16 February 2006
 Matthew Norman, sentenced to life imprisonment in Indonesia on 16 February 2006
 Scott Rush, sentenced to life imprisonment in Indonesia on 13 February 2006
 Martin Stephens, sentenced to life imprisonment in Indonesia on 14 February 2006
 Myuran Sukumaran, sentenced to death in Indonesia on 14 February 2006 and executed by firing squad on 29 April 2015
 Kevin Barlow and Brian Chambers, sentenced to death on 1 August 1985 and executed by hanging in Malaysia on 7 July 1986
 Nola Blake, sentenced to death in Thailand in 1988; sentence later commuted to life
 Schapelle Corby, served a 9-year prison sentence in Indonesia.
 Warren Fellows, drug courier sentenced to life imprisonment in Thailand in 1978
 Jim Krakouer, star AFL footballer imprisoned for 16 years on amphetamine trafficking charges
 Michael McAuliffe, executed in Malaysia
 David McMillan, smuggler, escaped from Thailand's notorious Bangkok Prison in 1996
 Van Tuong Nguyen (1980–2005) Vietnamese Australian  executed in Singapore
 Victor Peirce 1958–2002) member of the Pettingill family, murdered in 2001
 Kath Pettingill, former brothel worker and owner; criminal matriarch of the Pettingill family
 Roger Rogerson, corrupt former police officer
 Stephen John Sutton, imprisoned in Argentina on drug charges
 Robert Trimbole (1931–2007) International felon and drug lord
 Andrew "Benji" Veniamin, murdered in 2004
 Carl Williams, murdered in 2010

Families
Notable Australian criminal families:
 Moran family
 Jason Moran
 Lewis Moran
 Mark Moran
 Pettingill family
 Dennis Allen
 Kath Pettingill
 Victor Peirce
 Williams Family
 Carl Williams
 Roberta Williams

Fraudsters
Australians convicted of fraud:
 Rodney Adler, Sydney-based fraudster imprisoned for his role in transactions to hide true financial status of FAI Insurance
 Hajnal Ban, defrauded an elderly man with a mental incapacity of $660,000
 Alan Bond, English-Australian businessman imprisoned for three years in 1996 for fraud
 Brian Burke, former Western Australia Premier imprisoned for rorting travel expenses
 Michael Cobb, former politician convicted of fraud after rorting travel expenses
 Laurie Connell, gaoled for conspiring to pervert the course of justice
 Peter Foster, one of Australia's most famous conmen, gaoled for fraud
 Simon Hannes, insider trading ahead of takeover of TNT in 1996
 Theresa Lawson (1951–2004) former Sydney Woolworths payroll clerk imprisoned for stealing $2.6 million
 Ray O'Connor, former WA Premier imprisoned for stealing
 David Parker, former WA Deputy Premier imprisoned for perjury for evidence given to WA Inc royal commission
 Rene Rivkin (1944–2005) stockmarket guru imprisoned on insider trading charges
 Christopher Skase (1948–2001) failed businessman and fugitive who escaped to Majorca
 Andrew Theophanous, bribery and fraud offences relating to assisting in visa applications as a Member of Parliament
 Craig Thomson, fraud against the Health Services Union for sexual purposes and gratification
 Glenn Wheatley, (1948–2022) Musician and talent manager gaoled for tax evasion
 Ray Williams, fraud related to the collapse of HIH Insurance

Gangsters
 George Freeman, Sydney gangster
 Alphonse Gangitano, associate of Jason Moran, murdered
 Mick Gatto, well known member of the Melbourne underworld, active during the Melbourne gangland killings
 John 'Chow' Hayes, violent criminal who became known as Australia's first gangster
 Michael Kanaan, multiple murderer and gang member
 Lenny McPherson, Sydney gangster
 Tony Mokbel, serving a 12-year sentence, awaiting further charges
 Jason Moran (1967–2003) killed by rival gangster Carl Williams in a gang war
 Lewis Moran (1941–2004) ( killed by rival gangster Carl Williams in a gang war
 Mark Moran (1964–2000) killed by rival gangster Carl Williams in a gang war
 Michael Odisho, DLASTHR and BFL underworld Sydney gangster
 Nikolai Radev (1959–2003) killed in gang war
 Abraham Saffron, (1919–2006) Hotelier, nightclub owner and property developer. King of Kings Cross, Sydney gangster
 Squizzy Taylor, (1888–1927)  Melbourne gangster of the 1920s and before
 Andrew Veniamin (1975–2004) killed in gang war by Mick Gatto

Murderers
Australians convicted of murder:
 Dante Arthurs, murdered Sofia Rodriguez-Urrutia-Shu
 James Beauregard-Smith, convicted triple murderer and rapist
 Kenneth Brown, explorer and pastoralist hanged for murdering his wife
 Martin Bryant, convicted of 35 murders in the Port Arthur massacre
 Bevan Spencer von Einem, murderer
 Keith Faure, convicted Melbourne gangland killings murderer
 Christopher Dale Flannery, (born c. 1948, disappeared May 1985) known as "Mr-Rent-A-Kill", rapist and armed robber who shot an undercover policeman
 Sef Gonzales, murdered his mother, father and sister
 Maddison Hall, murdered a hitchhiker, had a sex change operation in prison
 Edward "Ned" Kelly (1854/1855–1880), Victorian bushranger murdered three troopers (policemen) named Lonigan, Scanlon and Kennedy, as well as former friend turned police informer Aaron Sherritt
 Julian Knight, Hoddle Street massacre
 Katherine Knight, murdered her de facto husband John Charles Thomas Price on 29 February 2000; first Australian woman to be sentenced to life imprisonment without parole
 Keli Lane, convicted of the 1996 murder of her newborn daughter Tegan on 13 December 2010
 Martin Leach, bound, gagged and stabbed Charmaine Aviet and bound, gagged, stabbed, raped and slit the throat of her cousin Janice Carnegie, both teenagers, before burying their bodies in a gully at Berry Springs
 Francesco Mangione, the Mr Whippy ice-cream turf war murderer
 Craig Minogue, Russell Street bombing
 Bradley John Murdoch, convicted for the murder of Peter Falconio
 Anthony Perish, convicted of murdering Terry Falconer
 Ronald Ryan, last person executed in Australian in 1967
 Joseph Schwab (1960–1987) murdered five tourists across the Northern Territory and Western Australia in 1987
 Neddy Smith (1944–2021) convicted of the murder of Sydney brothel owner, Harvey Jones
 John Travers, convicted ringleader of the Anita Cobby murder
 Brenton Tarrant, convicted of the Christchurch mosque shootings in 2019.

Rapists

Australians convicted of rape:
 Peter Dupas, serial killer
 Raymond Edmunds, Mr Stinky or the Donvale Rapist.
 Sydney gang rapes
 Bilal Skaf, gang leader

Serial killers
Australians convicted of multiple murders:
 Catherine Birnie, rape and murder of four women in Perth in 1986
 David Birnie (1951–2005) rape and murder of four women in Perth in 1986
 Gregory Brazel, shot dead a woman in 1982 armed robbery, and murdered two sex workers in 1990
 John Bunting, murder of 12 victims known as the Snowtown murders or bodies in a barrel murders.
 Robert Francis Burns, murdered eight men between 1876 and 1881 in Victoria and New South Wales
 Eric Edgar Cooke, The Nedlands monster
 Bandali Debs, convicted of murdering two police officers and two prostitutes in the 1990s
 Paul Denyer, Melbourne-based serial killer during the early 1990s dubbed the "Frankston Serial Killer"
 Peter Dupas, Melbourne-based serial killer who killed several times upon release from prison
 Bradley Robert Edwards; convicted of killing two females and suspected of killing a third in Claremont , Western Australia during 1996–1997.
 Leonard Fraser, also known as "The Rockhampton Rapist"; killed four to seven women in Rockhampton, Queensland
 John Wayne Glover (1932–2005) the Sydney North Shore granny murderer
 Caroline Grills (c.1888–1960) also known as "Auntie Thally"; serial poisoner of five family members
 Paul Steven Haigh, convicted of the murders of six people in the late 1970s and another in 1991; currently serving six life sentences without the possibility of parole
 Matthew James Harris, strangled a friend's brother, a female friend and a male neighbour to death over five weeks in 1998 in Wagga Wagga
 Thomas Jeffrey, Tasmanian penal colony escapee responsible for the murders of five people; executed in 1826
 Eddie Leonski, American serial killer known as the Brownout Strangler
 John Lynch, convicted of the murder of Kernes Landregan in 1842 near Berrima, New South Wales; prior to his execution he confessed to murdering ten people during the period 1836 to 1842.
 William MacDonald, also known as "the Mutilator"; killed at least five men between June 1961 and April 1963
 John and Sarah Makin; baby farmers convicted for the murder of Horace Amber Murray; suspected of the murders of 13 infants in total.
 Ivan Milat, (1944–2019) convicted of the murder of seven young men and women between 1989 and 1993; known as Australia's most prolific serial killer. His crimes are collectively referred to as the "Backpacker murders".
 Martha Needle, poisoner of four family members and boyfriend's brother
 Derek Percy, linked to the mysterious deaths of at least nine other children in the 1960s.
 Martha Rendell, killed three stepchildren with hydrochloric acid in the 20th century; last woman to be hanged in Western Australia
 Lindsay Robert Rose, serial killer and contract killer from New South Wales who murdered five people between 1984 and 1994
 Arnold Sodeman, the schoolgirl strangler
 Carl Williams, convicted of murdering three people and suspected of killing, or ordering the killing of, many more in the Melbourne gangland killings.
 Christopher Worrell and James Miller: also known as the "Truro Murderers"; were convicted of killing seven people in 1976–1977.

Others

Australians convicted of other offences:
 Geoffrey Edelsten (1943–2021) high-profile doctor convicted of soliciting a hit man and perverting the course of justice
 Marcus Einfeld, former Superior Court Judge, imprisoned subsequent to his retirement for lying relative to a speeding ticket
 David Hicks, Guantánamo Bay detainee, convicted of providing material support for terrorism
 Bon Levi, conman
 Barry Morris (1935–2001) politician who was gaoled for making bomb and death threats
 Mark "Chopper" Read (1954–2013) attempted murder, armed robbery, assault, kidnapping, torture, arson and impersonating a police officer

See also
 List of Australians imprisoned or executed abroad
 List of Australian politicians convicted of crimes

References

 
Criminals
Australian criminals, List of
Australian criminals, List of
Australian criminals, List of